Centre County is a county in the Commonwealth of Pennsylvania. As of the 2020 census, the population was 158,172. Its county seat is Bellefonte.  Centre County comprises the State College, PA Metropolitan Statistical Area.

History
The lands of the future Centre County were first recorded by James Potter in 1764. Potter, having reached the top of Nittany Mountain, and "....seeing the prairies and noble forest beneath him, cried out to his attendant, 'By heavens, Thompson, I have discovered an empire!'"   After the American Revolutionary War, Centre County was created on February 13, 1800, from parts of Huntingdon, Lycoming, Mifflin, and Northumberland counties; it was named for its central location in the state.

Geography
It is the fifth-largest county in Pennsylvania by area and uses area code 814.

Centre has a humid continental climate which is warm-summer (Dfb) except near the Bald Eagle Creek from Wingate downstream where it is hot-summer (Dfa).

Features
Bald Eagle Valley
Bald Eagle Mountain
Nittany Valley
Mount Nittany
Penns Valley
Tussey Mountain

Adjacent counties
Clinton County (north)
Union County (east)
Mifflin County (southeast)
Huntingdon County (south)
Blair County (south)
Clearfield County (west)

Demographics

As of the 2010 census,  there were 153,990 people, 57,573 households, and 31,256 families residing in the county. The population density was 139 people per square mile (54/km2). There were 63,297 housing units at an average density of 57 per square mile (22/km2).  The racial makeup of the county was 89.4% White, 3.0% Black or African American, 0.1% Native American, 5.2% Asian, 0.1% Pacific Islander, 0.7% from other races, and 1.5% from two or more races. 2.4% of the population were Hispanic or Latino of any race.

There were 57,573 households, out of which 23.3% had children under the age of 18 living with them, 44.6% were married couples living together, 3.3% had a male householder with no wife present, 6.4% had a female householder with no husband present, and 45.7% were non-families. 28.7% of all households were made up of individuals, and 8.3% had someone living alone who was 65 years of age or older. The average household size was 2.38 and the average family size was 2.91.

In the county, 15.9% of the population was under the age of 18, 28.9% was from 18 to 24, 22.6% from 25 to 44, 21.3% from 45 to 64, and 11.3% was 65 years of age or older. The median age was 29 years. For every 100 females there were 107.5 males. For every 100 females age 18 and over, there were 108.1 males.

2020 census

Metropolitan Statistical Area

The United States Office of Management and Budget has designated Centre County as the State College, PA Metropolitan Statistical Area (MSA).  As of the 2010 U.S. Census the metropolitan area ranked 13th most populous in the State of Pennsylvania and the 259th most populous in the United States with a population of 155,403.  Centre County is also a part of the larger State College–DuBois, PA Combined Statistical Area (CSA), which combines the populations of Centre County as well as Clearfield County to the west.  The Combined Statistical Area ranked ninth in the State of Pennsylvania and 123rd most populous in the United States with a population of 236,577.

Law and government

County Commissioners
Mark Higgins, Chairman (Democrat)
Amber Concepcion, Vice-chair (Democrat)
Steven G. Dershem, Commissioner (Republican)

Other county offices
Clerk of Courts and Prothonotary, Jeremy Breon, Democrat
Controller, Jason Moser, Democrat
Coroner, Scott Sayers, Democrat
District Attorney, Bernie Cantorna, Democrat
Recorder of Deeds, Joe Davidson, Republican
Register of Wills, Christine Millinder, Republican
Sheriff, Bryan Sampsel, Republican
Treasurer, Colleen Kennedy, Democrat
Jury Commissioner, Laura Shadle, Democrat

State Senate
 Greg Rothman, Republican, Pennsylvania's 34th Senatorial District

State House of Representatives
 Stephanie Borowicz, Republican, Pennsylvania's 76th Representative District
 Scott Conklin, Democrat, Pennsylvania's 77th Representative District
 Rich Irvin, Republican, Pennsylvania's 81st Representative District
 Kerry Benninghoff, Republican, Pennsylvania's 171st Representative District

United States House of Representatives
 Glenn "G.T." Thompson, Republican, Pennsylvania's 15th congressional district

United States Senate
Bob Casey, Jr., Democrat
John Fetterman, Democrat

Politics

|}

As of August 29 2022, there were 105,240 registered voters in Centre County.

 Democratic: 44,034 (41.84%)
 Republican: 42,325 (40.22%)
 No party affiliation: 14,289 (13.58%)
 Other: 4,592 (4.36%)

Centre County had for many years been a strongly Republican county, like most of rural Pennsylvania. In the early 21st century, however, it has been more competitive. In 2000 George W. Bush defeated Al Gore with 52% of the vote to Gore's 43%. In 2004 Bush won the county by a much smaller margin. Bush won 51% to Kerry's 47%, a margin of only 4%. In 2006, Governor Ed Rendell and Bob Casey Jr. both carried Centre, and Democrat Scott Conklin decisively won the State House seat left open by the retirement of Republican Lynn Herman in the 77th district. In 2008, Democrats captured the countywide registration edge, Barack Obama carried the county with 55% of the vote to McCain's 44%, and Democratic statewide winners (Rob McCord for Treasurer and Jack Wagner for Auditor General also carried Centre).

In 2012, Barack Obama won the county in his reelection campaign by a very narrow margin, 48.9% to 48.65%, a difference of just 175 votes. In 2016, Democrat Hillary Clinton beat Republican nominee Donald Trump 47.76% to 45.86%. In that same election, incumbent Republican Senator Pat Toomey beat Democratic opponent Katie McGinty 47.91% to 46.2% in the county.

Education

Colleges and universities
Pennsylvania State University

Community, junior, and technical colleges
South Hills School of Business & Technology
Central Pennsylvania Institute of Science and Technology, public Vo Tech in Pleasant Gap

Public school districts

Bald Eagle Area School District
Bellefonte Area School District
Keystone Central School District (also in Clinton County)
Penns Valley Area School District
Philipsburg-Osceola Area School District (also in Clearfield County)
State College Area School District
Tyrone Area School District (also in Blair County and Huntingdon County)

Public charter schools
Young Scholars of Central PA Charter School
Centre Learning Community Charter School
Nittany Valley Charter School
There are 13 public cyber charter schools in Pennsylvania that are available for free statewide, to children K-12. See: Education in Pennsylvania.

Private schools
As reported by the Pennsylvania Department of Education 2010.

Bower Hollow Parochial School - Woodward
Centre County Christian Academy - Bellefonte
Elk Creek School - Rebersburg
Faith Christian Academy - Philipsburg
Grace Prep - State College
Hill Side School - Rebersburg
Hubler Ridge School - Bellefonte
Kramer Gap School - Spring Mills
Little Nittany Amish Parochial School - Howard
Mountain View School - Rebersburg
Nittany Christian School - State College
Our Lady of Victory School - State College
Peach Lane Amish School - Madisonburg
Penns Valley Amish Paroch School - Woodward
Rockville School - Rebersburg
Spring Bank School - Rebersburg
St John Evangelist School - Bellefonte
St. Joseph's Academy - Boalsburg
State College Friends School - State College
Sunny Meadow Parochial School - Howard
Sunset View School - Howard
Sunset View School - Rebersburg
Windy Poplars School - Centre Hall
Woodside Amish School - Spring Mills

Libraries
Centre County Libraries
Centre County Library & Historical Museum - Bellefonte
Centre Hall Area Branch Library - Centre Hall
Holt Memorial Library - Philipsburg
Centre County Bookmobile
American Philatelic Research Library
Schlow Centre Region Library

Pennsylvania State University libraries
Pattee Library
Paterno Library
 Architecture and Landscape Architecture Library
 Earth and Mineral Sciences Library
 Engineering Library 
 Physical and Mathematical Sciences Library

Transportation

University Park Airport operates daily commercial and general aviation flights.

Major highways

Recreation

There are six Pennsylvania state parks in Centre County.
Bald Eagle State Park is the largest state park in Centre County with 5,900-acres (2,388 ha). It is on Pennsylvania Route 150 between Milesburg and Lock Haven.
Black Moshannon State Park west of State College has a bog with three species of carnivorous plants and 17 orchid varieties.
McCalls Dam State Park is a small park on a dirt road in the extreme eastern tip of the county.
Penn-Roosevelt State Park is the site of a former segregated CCC camp for African American men.
Poe Paddy State Park is at the confluence of Big Poe Creek and Penns Creek.
Poe Valley State Park is in an isolated valley surrounding 25 acre Poe Lake.

Media
Centre County's main daily newspaper is the Centre Daily Times (part of the McClatchy Company chain).  Alternative newspapers include the Centre County Gazette and State College City Guide.  Newspapers of Pennsylvania State University's main campus include the student-run Daily Collegian.

Numerous magazines are also published including Town & Gown, State College Magazine, Good Life in Happy Valley, Blue White Illustrated, Pennsylvania Business Central, and Voices of Central Pennsylvania.

The radio market of Centre County is ranked #257 in the nation.  Some of the more popular stations include WPSU, WKPS, WZWW, WLEJ, WFGE, WBHV, WRSC-FM, WRSC, WOWY, and WBUS.

Centre County is part of the Johnstown/Altoona/State College television market, which is currently ranked #99 in the nation.  Television stations broadcasting out of State College include WPSU (PBS) and WHVL-LD (MyNetworkTV) as well as C-NET, Centre County's Government and Education Access Television Network, which broadcasts on two channels: CGTV (Government Access TV) and CETV (Educational Access TV). Johnstown-based WJAC-TV (NBC) and Altoona-based WTAJ-TV (CBS) also maintain satellite studios and offices here.

Communities

Under Pennsylvania law, there are five types of incorporated municipalities: cities, home rule municipalities, boroughs, townships, and, in at most two cases, towns. The following municipalities, boroughs and townships are in Centre County:

Home rule municipalities
Ferguson Township (Happy Valley)
State College (Happy Valley)

Boroughs

Bellefonte (county seat)
Centre Hall
Howard
Milesburg
Millheim
Philipsburg
Port Matilda
Snow Shoe
Unionville

Townships

Benner
Boggs
Burnside
College (Happy Valley)
Curtin
Ferguson (Happy Valley)
Gregg
Haines
Halfmoon
Harris (Happy Valley)
Howard
Huston
Liberty
Marion
Miles
Patton (Happy Valley)
Penn
Potter
Rush
Snow Shoe
Spring
Taylor
Union
Walker
Worth

Census-designated places
Census-designated places are geographical areas designated by the U.S. Census Bureau for the purposes of compiling demographic data. They are not actual jurisdictions under Pennsylvania law. Other unincorporated communities, such as villages, may be listed here as well.

Aaronsburg
Baileyville
Blanchard
Boalsburg
Casanova
Clarence
Coburn
Continental Courts
Eagle Creek
Eagleville
Holters Crossing
Houserville
Hublersburg
Jacksonville
Julian
Lemont
Madisonburg
Mingoville
Monument
Moose Run
Moshannon
Mount Eagle
Nittany
North Philipsburg
Orviston
Park Forest Village
Peru
Pine Glen
Pine Grove Mills
Pleasant Gap
Potters Mills
Ramblewood
Rebersburg
Runville
Sandy Ridge
Snydertown
South Philipsburg
Spring Mills
Stormstown
Toftrees
Woodward
Yarnell
Zion

Other communities

Axemann
Colyer
Graysdale
Gum Stump
Ingleby (ghost town)
Martha Furnace
Struble
Tusseyville
University Park
Waddle
Wingate

Population ranking
The population ranking of the following table is based on the 2010 census of Centre County.

† county seat

See also

 National Register of Historic Places listings in Centre County, Pennsylvania

References

External links

 Official website
 Centre Daily Times Local Newspaper
 Interactive Web Mapping Application for Centre County
 Pennsylvania Historical and Museum Commission (PHMC) Historical Marker Search
Open Access edition of The History of Centre and Clinton counties, Pennsylvania (1883) by John Blair Linn at the Penn State University Library website

 
1800 establishments in Pennsylvania
Counties of Appalachia
Populated places established in 1800